Peter Karl Lamont is a research fellow at the University of Edinburgh, working on the history, theory and performance of magic. He is a magician, Member of The Magic Circle, and a former president of the Edinburgh Magic Circle. He has performed and lectured across the world.

He is the author of The Rise of the Indian Rope Trick: The Biography of a Legend, which discusses the Indian rope trick, and The first psychic: the peculiar mystery of a Victorian wizard , which traces the life and times of the "first psychic" Daniel Dunglas Home, a Scottish medium, born in Edinburgh.

List of works

Books
 Lamont, P. & Wiseman, R. (1999). Magic in Theory: An Introduction to the Theoretical and Psychological Elements of Conjuring (Hatfield: University of Hertfordshire Press)
 Lamont, P. (2004). The Rise of the Indian Rope Trick: Biography of a Legend (London: Little, Brown)
 Lamont, P. (2005). The First Psychic: The Peculiar Mystery of a Notorious Victorian Wizard (London: Little, Brown)
 Lamont, P. (2013). Extraordinary Beliefs: A Historical Approach to a Psychological Problem (Cambridge: Cambridge University Press)

Papers
Lamont, P. (2004). Spiritualism and a Mid-Victorian Crisis of Evidence. Historical Journal 47 (4): 897–920.
Lamont, P; Bates, C. (2007). Conjuring Images of India in Nineteenth-Century Britain. Social History 32 (3): 308–324.

References

Scottish historians
Critics of parapsychology
Historians of magic
Scottish magicians
Living people
Academics of the University of Edinburgh
Year of birth missing (living people)
Place of birth missing (living people)
Date of birth missing (living people)